NGC 191 is a spiral galaxy located in the constellation Cetus. It was discovered on November 28, 1785 by William Herschel.

NGC 191 is currently interacting with IC 1563. For that reason it was included in Halton Arp's Atlas of Peculiar Galaxies, under the section "Elliptical galaxies close to and perturbing spiral galaxies."

References

External links
 

Cetus (constellation)
127
002331
0191
Intermediate spiral galaxies
Interacting galaxies